Aloeides conradsi, the Conrad's copper, is a butterfly in the family Lycaenidae. It is found in Kenya, Tanzania, Malawi and Zambia. The habitat consists of savanna.

Both sexes are attracted to flowers.

Subspecies
A. c. conradsi (Tanzania)
A. c. angoniensis Tite & Dickson, 1973 (Tanzania, Malawi, Zambia)
A. c. jacksoni Tite & Dickson, 1973 (Tanzania, Kenya: east of the Rift Valley)
A. c. talboti Tite & Dickson, 1973 (Tanzania, Kenya: west of the Rift Valley)

References

Butterflies described in 1907
Aloeides